René Leduc (1898–1968) was a French engineer who is much acclaimed for his work on ramjets. In 1949 the Leduc 0.10 became the first aircraft to fly under the power of ramjets alone. Development of this aircraft had begun in 1937, but was severely delayed by the interruption of the Second World War.

After cancellation of French Air Ministry contracts for the Leduc ramjet aircraft projects, in 1958 Leduc's company converted from aeronautics to hydraulics, becoming known as 'Hydro Leduc' and eventually focussing on production of hydraulic pumps for excavators.

References

1898 births
1968 deaths
20th-century French engineers
Jet engine pioneers